Oluta Popoluca also called Olutec is a moribund Mixe–Zoquean language of the Mixean branch spoken by a few elderly people in the town of Oluta in Southern Veracruz, Mexico.

77 self-reported speaking Oluteco in a 2020 census,
but a count published in 2018 found only one remaining speaker.

Phonology 

Vowels are /a/, /e/, /i/, /o/, /u/, /ʉ/.

Notes

Bibliography
Zavala Maldonado, Roberto. 2003. Obviación en Oluteco. Proceedings of the Conference on Indigenous Languages of Latin America–I (23–25 October 2003, University of Texas at Austin).

Indigenous languages of Mexico
Mesoamerican languages
Mixe–Zoque languages
Endangered Mixe–Zoque languages